Thrifty's Inc. (doing business as Bluenotes) is a Canadian "lifestyle" clothing brand. Bluenotes currently operates 120+ stores in Canada, across all major provinces, and it includes
an online store. Thrifty's' 107 stores were bought out by U.S. retailer American Eagle Outfitters from Dylex and rebranded the store with name Bluenotes in 2000. Eventually the division was sold to privately owned YM, Inc. in 2004.

Products 
Bluenotes uses denim as the base and then sells many other things.

Despite the focus on denim Bluenotes also carries a variety of other clothing items such as onesies, polos, graphic tees, plaids, hoodies, sweaters, dresses, swimwear, footwear, and accessories.

In 2019 Bluenotes stores began to carry some Aéropostale merchandise, which had ceased operating in Canada in 2016.

Marketing strategy 
The target market can be described as Millennial consumers, value-conscious (jeans are priced no higher than $69.99 each), and fit-conscious.

In 2008, ad agency MacLaren McCann created the "If Jeans Could Talk" campaign to link the Bluenotes brand with their denim line. Bluenotes targets teenagers and young adults for the clothes.

References

External links 
 

Clothing brands
Clothing brands of Canada
Companies based in Toronto
Clothing retailers of Canada